The Do-Deca-Pentathlon is a 2012 independent comedy film written and directed brothers Jay Duplass and Mark Duplass. The film stars Mark Kelly, Steve Zissis, Jennifer Lafleur, and Julie Vorus. The film had its world premiere at SXSW on March 11, 2012. It was released on June 26, 2012, through video on demand, prior to being released in a limited release on July 6, 2012, by Fox Searchlight and Red Flag Releasing.

Plot
The film is about two brothers in their mid-30s (played by Mark Kelly and Steve Zissis) whose lifelong rivalry compels them to secretly complete an athletic competition that they came up with in high school but left unfinished.

Cast
 Mark Kelly as Jeremy
 Steve Zissis as Mark
 Brendan Robinson as Young Mark
 Jennifer Lafleur as Stephanie
 Julie Vorus as Alice

Production
Production on the film commenced in 2008, in New Orleans.

Release
The film had its world premiere at SXSW on March 11, 2012. It went on to premiere at the San Francisco International Film Festival on April 26, 2012. Shortly after, it was announced that Fox Searchlight Pictures, and Red Flag Releasing had acquired distribution rights to the film. The film was released through video on demand on June 26, 2012, before a limited release on July 6, 2012.

Critical response
, the film holds a 76% approval rating on Rotten Tomatoes, based on 41 reviews with an average rating of 6.3/10. The website's critics consensus reads: "Slight but satisfying, The Do-Deca-Pentathlon wrings fresh laughs from tired man-child comedy tropes." Critic Stephen Holden of The New York Times called it the Duplass brothers' second-best film, after their debut, The Puffy Chair.

References

External links

2012 films
2012 independent films
Duplass Brothers Productions films
Films about fictional Olympics-inspired events
American independent films
2010s English-language films
2010s American films